The following lists events hat happened during 2006 in Denmark.

Incumbents
 Monarch – Margrethe II
 Prime minister – Anders Fogh Rasmussen

Events

January
 21 January – The son of Crown Prince Frederik is baptised as Christian Valdemar Henri John.
 26 January – People in Saudi Arabia call for a boycott of Danish products, which spreads to other countries due to the Jyllands-Posten Muhammad cartoons controversy.
 29 January – Libya closes its embassy in Denmark over the Muhammad Drawings controversy.

February
 4 February – The Danish, and as a consequence of sharing the same building, the Chilean and Swedish embassies in Damascus, are firebombed by protestors denouncing the publication of what they consider sacrilegious cartoons depicting Muhammad. The Norwegian embassy is also burned.
 5 February – The Danish embassy in Beirut, Lebanon, is set on fire by protesters because of the continued controversy over the cartoons depicting Muhammad, and rumors of Qur'an burnings in Denmark.
 7 February – Jyllands-Posten Muhammad cartoons controversy
 An Iranian newspaper, Hamshahri, has announced a competition for the best cartoon of the Holocaust "as a test of the boundaries of free speech".
 As the Danish embassy in Tehran is attacked by hundreds of protesters, five people are killed in Afghanistan as protests against European Muhammed cartoons sweep across the country.
 19 February – Jyllands-Posten Muhammad cartoons controversy
 Italian reform minister Roberto Calderoli resigns after criticism for wearing a T-shirt depicting the cartoons. The incident triggered yesterday's rioting outside the Italian consulate in Benghazi, Libya, in which at least 10 people died.
 Sixteen people are killed in northern Nigeria as demonstrators protest the cartoons by storming and burning Christian churches and businesses.

March
 15 March – Five arrests are made over the UK Islamist demonstration outside the Danish Embassy in London against the cartoons depicting Muhammad.

September
 23 September – Remains of Dagmar of Denmark, the mother of the last Tsar of Russia, are transported from the Roskilde Cathedral to Saint Petersburg in order to be reburied in the Peter and Paul Cathedral on 28 September.

November
 2 November – MTV Europe Music Awards 2006 are presented in Bella Center, Copenhagen.

December
 13 December – Lars Barfoed resigns as Minister of Family and Consumption because of issues with his ministry's food inspections. Carina Christensen is named as his successor the 15 December.

The arts

Architecture
 22 June – Lundgaard & Tranberg's Kilen building for CBS in Copenhagen wins a 2006 RIBA European Award at the Royal Institute of British Architects' annual awards ceremony in London.
 30 June – In the Teatro Olimpico in Vicenza, Kim Herforth Nielse from 3XN receives the Dedalo Minosse Prize for the firm's Muziekgebouw in Amsterdam.

Film
 19 February – Pernille Fischer Christensen's A Soap wins the Jury Grand Prix at the 56th Berlin International Film Festival.

Literature

Music

Sport

Badminton
 1622  Jens Eriksen and Martin Lundgaard Hansen wins gold in men's double at the 2006 All England Open Badminton Championships.
 12–16 April – With four gold medals, three silver medals and three bronze medals, Denmark finishes as the best nation at the 20th European Badminton Championships in Den Bosch, Netherlands.
 1824 September  Denmark wins two bronze medals at the 2006 IBF World Championships.

Football
 6 April – FC Copenhagen wins 2005–06 Royal League by defeating Lillestrøm SK 1–0 in the final.
 11 May – Randers FC wins the 2005–06 Danish Cup after a 1-0 win against Esbjerg fB in the final at Parken Stadium.

Handball
 5 February – Denmark takes the bronze medals at the 2006 European Men's Handball Championship by defeating Croatia.
 December
 GOG Svendborg is defeated 31–30 by BM Ciudad Real in the second leg of the Round of 16 of the 2006–07 EHF Champions League and is finished in the tournament after 64–58 on aggregate.
 KIF Kolding defeats MKB Veszprém KC 31–28 in the second leg of the Round of 16 of the 2006–07 EHF Champions League but is finished in the tournament after 60–53 on aggregate.

Other
 14 January – Mikkel Kessler defends his WBA super-middleweight title against Eric Lucas in Brøndby, Denmark.
 21 May – Thomas Bjørn wins Nissan Irish Open on the 2006 European Tour.
 23 July – Denmark wins the 2006 Speedway World Cup in  Reading, England.
 23 July – Team CSC finishes second in the Team classification of the 2006 Tour de France and Michael Rasmussen wins the Mountains classification.
 26 July-6 August 2006  Jakob Andkjær wins a bronze medal in 50 m butterfly at the 2006 European Aquatics Championships.
 14 October – Mikkel Kessler is elevated to WBA "super champion" status after winning the WBC title in a unification battle against WBC World Champion Markus Beyer, at the Parken Stadium. He won by knockout at 2:58 in round 3.

Births

Deaths
 4 January – John Hahn-Petersen, actor (born 1930)
 14 May  Dagmar Andreasen, businesswoman (born 1920)

See also
2006 in Danish television

References

 
2000s in Denmark
Years of the 21st century in Denmark
Denmark
Denmark